Morning Way is a 1970 album by Trader Horne. It was released by Pye Records in 1970. The album was the only release by Trader Horne and sold limited numbers at the time. The album was re-released on CD in 2008 by Esoteric Records. Through the years this LP has reached legendary status and it is considered one of the lost gems of the 1960s..

Track listing

Personnel
Judy Dyble – Vocals, electric autoharp and piano
Jackie McAuley – vocals, guitar, harpsichord, organ, piano, flute, congas and celeste
Ray Elliot – alto flute, bass clarinet
Andy White – drums
John Godfrey – bass, arrangements
Paul Winter – sleeve design

References

External links 
 Judy Dyble's website
 Amazon's Editorial Reviews
 Allmusic review by Dave Thompson

1970 debut albums
Esoteric Recordings albums
Pye Records albums
Trader Horne (band) albums
Psychedelic folk albums